River Raid is a vertically scrolling shooter designed and programmed by Carol Shaw and published by Activision in 1982 for the Atari 2600 video game console. Over a million game cartridges were sold.  Activision later ported the title to the Atari 5200, ColecoVision, and Intellivision consoles, as well as to the Commodore 64, IBM PCjr, MSX, ZX Spectrum, and Atari 8-bit family. Shaw did the Atari 8-bit and Atari 5200 ports herself.

Activision published a less successful sequel in 1988 without Shaw's involvement.

Gameplay

Viewed from a top-down perspective, the player flies a fighter jet over the River of No Return in a raid behind enemy lines. The player's jet can only move left and right—it cannot maneuver up and down the screen—but it can accelerate and decelerate. The player's jet crashes if it collides with the riverbank or an enemy craft, or if the jet runs out of fuel. Assuming fuel can be replenished, and if the player evades damage, gameplay is essentially unlimited.

The player scores points for shooting enemy tankers (30 points), helicopters (60 points), fuel depots (80 points), jets (100 points), and bridges (500 points). The jet refuels when it flies over a fuel depot. A bridge marks the end of a game level. Non-Atari 2600 ports of the game add hot air balloons that are worth 60 points when shot as well as tanks along the sides of the river that shoot at the player's jet.

Destroying bridges also serve as the game's checkpoints. If the player crashes the plane they will start their next jet at the last destroyed bridge.

Development

For its time, River Raid provided an inordinate amount of non-random, repeating terrain despite constrictive computer memory limits. For the Atari 2600 the game with its program code and graphics had to fit into a 4 KB ROM. The game program does not actually store the sequence of terrain and other objects. Instead, a procedural generation algorithm manifests them by employing a linear-feedback shift register with a hard-coded starting value, also called a pseudorandom number generator. Because of this the algorithm generates the same game world every time the program executes. The enemy crafts' AI relies on another pseudorandom number generator to make the start of the enemy movement less predictable as this pseudorandom number generator's starting value is not reset when a new game starts.

Reception
InfoWorld in 1983 stated that River Raid might be the best Atari 8-bit game of the year, "more challenging than any VCS version" and superior to others like Caverns of Mars. Antic in 1984 said that the Atari 8-bit version was identical to the 2600 original, but with slightly "spiffed up ... game visuals". The Deseret News in 1984 called River Raid "one of the most playable and entertaining of all war games". The newspaper gave the ColecoVision version four stars, recommending it to all console owners and describing it as "a definite winner all the way". The game received the award for "1984 Best Action Videogame" and a Certificate of Merit in the category of "1984 Best Computer Action Game" at the 5th annual Arkie Awards, where the judges described it as "provid[ing] the brand of non-stop excitement the blast brigaders adore".

Computer and Video Games rated the Atari VCS and ColecoVision versions 92% in 1989.

River Raid was the first video game to be banned for minors (including a complete ban on advertising, mail ordering and any sort of public display) in West Germany by the Bundesprüfstelle für jugendgefährdende Schriften (Federal Department for Works Harmful to Young Persons, now called the Federal Department for Media Harmful to Young Persons).

Legacy
In 1995, Flux magazine ranked the Atari 2600 version 87th in its Top 100 Video Games. In 1996, Next Generation listed the Atari 2600 version as number 81 on their "Top 100 Games of All Time", commenting that, "Nostalgia aside, the 2600 sucks. ... But this game is still great, for one main reason: Level design."

Activision published the relatively obscure River Raid II for the Atari 2600 in 1988. This sequel, programmed by David Lubar based on a concept by Dan Kitchen, has similar gameplay, but with a different landscape and increased difficulty. The Games Machine magazine reviewed River Raid 2 and gave it a 76% rating.

A further sequel called River Raid: The Mission of No Return was a planned release for the SNES in 1991 but it was cancelled.

In 1995, River Raid was published for Microsoft Windows as part of Activision's Atari 2600 Action Pack.

See also

List of Atari 2600 games
List of Activision games: 1980–1999

References

External links
 River Raid for the Atari 2600 at Atari Mania
 River Raid for the Atari 8-bit family at Atari Mania
 
 

1982 video games
Activision games
Atari 2600 games
Atari 5200 games
Atari 8-bit family games
ColecoVision games
Commodore 64 games
Intellivision games
MSX games
Vertically scrolling shooters
Censored video games
ZX Spectrum games
Video games developed in the United States